The United Nations (UN) Public Service Award is the most prestigious international recognition of excellence in public service. It rewards the creative achievements and contributions of public service institutions that lead to a more effective and responsive public administration in countries worldwide. Through an annual competition, the UN Public Service Awards promotes the role, professionalism and visibility of public service.

Establishment of the UNPSA
In 2003, the UN General Assembly, in its resolution A/RES/57/277,
designated June 23 as the UN Public Service Day to "celebrate the value and virtue of public service to the community". The UN Economic and Social Council established that the United Nations Public Service Awards be bestowed on Public Service Day for contributions made to the cause of enhancing the role, prestige and visibility of public service.

The United Nations Millennium Declaration emphasized the role of democratic and participatory governance in assuring the rights of men and women to "live their lives and raise their children in dignity, free from hunger and from the fear of violence, oppression, or injustice". It also noted that good governance within each country is a prerequisite to "making development a reality for everyone and to freeing the entire human race from want".

Experience demonstrates that without good governance, nationally or internationally, and an efficient, competent, professional, responsive and highly dedicated public service, sustainable development and livelihood are jeopardized. The former UN Secretary-General, in his speech at the World Youth Forum in 1998, stressed the importance of public service by encouraging the world's youth to enter into this field. He said, "In this changing world of new challenges, we need, more than ever before, dedicated and talented individuals to enter public service. More than ever before, we need people like you sitting here today, to make the choice of service to humankind."

Purpose of the Awards
The overall purpose of the United Nations Public Service Awards is to recognize the institutional contribution made by public servants to enhance the role, professionalism, image and visibility of the public service (Economic and Social Council decision 2000/231). It can be translated into the following more specific objectives:
(a) To reward service to citizens and motivate public servants worldwide to sustain the momentum of innovation and the improvement of the delivery of public services;
(b) To collect and disseminate successful practices and experiences in public administration in order to support efforts for improvements in country level public service delivery;
(c) Through success stories, to counterbalance any negative image of public administration, raise the image and prestige of public servants and revitalize public administration as a noble discipline on which development greatly depends;
(d) To promote, encourage and facilitate networking among institutions and organizations relevant to public administration and strengthen the networks of the United Nations programme on public administration and development; and
(e) To enhance professionalism in the public service in rewarding the successful experiences in innovations and excellence in the public service.

Who is eligible
All Public organizations/agencies at national and sub-national levels, as well as public/private partnerships and organizations performing outsourced public service functions, are eligible for nomination. The United Nations Public Service Awards take into consideration a geographical distribution of five regions. In order to level the playing field for nominations received from countries with varying levels of development and income, the following five regions have been established:
(a) Africa
(b) Asia and the Pacific
(c) Europe and North America
(d) Latin America and the Caribbean
(e) Western Asia

Eligible nominators include: Government departments and agencies; universities, non-governmental organizations, professional associations, etc. Purely scientific innovations, e.g. in medical or environmental science, do not qualify for the United Nations Public Service Awards.

UNPSA categories and criteria
For the 2021 round of nominations, the United Nations Public Service Awards categories are as follows:
Category 1: Fostering innovation to deliver inclusive and equitable services for all including through digital transformation; 
Category 2: Enhancing the effectiveness of public institutions to reach the SDGs; 
Category 3: Promoting gender-responsive public services to achieve the SDGs; and
Category 4: Institutional preparedness and response in times of crisis.

For a description of the categories and application criteria, see UN Public Service Awards

Application process
The application process consists of two steps.

Step 1
An application form has to be completed online. Nominations are allowed to enter the competition in one of the six official United Nations languages (Arabic, Chinese, English, French, Russian or Spanish).

Step 2
Upon reception of the applications, the Division for Public Institutions and Digital Government (DPIDG) pre-selects nominations. Candidates are asked to submit additional information such as a cover letter, letters of reference, supporting documents (e.g., evaluation and audit reports, results of client surveys), etc during the application process. DPIDG then shortlists candidates on the basis of the documents provided. The short-listed are subsequently considered by the United Nations Committee of Experts in Public Administration. After due consideration, the Committee advises the UN Secretary-General concerning the winners of the Awards.

UN Public Service Awards Ceremony
UN Public Service Awards' winners are recognized during UN Public Service Day on 23 June of every year at a high-level event held in New York at UN Headquarters or in a host country as part of the United Nations Public Service Forum. UN Public Service Day intends to celebrate the value and virtue of public service to the community; highlight the contribution of public service in the development process; recognize the work of public servants, and encourage young people to pursue careers in the public sector. Since the first Awards Ceremony in 2003, the United Nations has received an increasing number of submissions from all around the world.

Past Award Winners

Management of the UNPSA Programme
It is managed by the Division for Public Institutions and Digital Government of the United Nations Department of Economic and Social Affairs.

See also

United Nations
United Nations Public Administration Network
UN Public Service Day

References

External links
UNPSA official site
UNPSA on-line application system
Public Service Innovation Hub

United Nations awards